Shiselweni I is an inkhundla of Eswatini, located in the Shiselweni District. Its population as of the 2007 census was 12,823.

References
Statoids.com, retrieved December 11, 2010

Populated places in Shiselweni Region